The UNESCO King Sejong Literacy Prize (Korean, Hangeul : 유네스코 세종대왕 문해상) is an annual prize awarded to three institutions, organizations or individuals "for their contribution to the fight against illiteracy."

It is funded by the Government of the Republic of Korea which first offered the Prize in 1989, honouring the outstanding contribution made to literacy by Sejong the Great who created the Korean alphabet Hangul. The Prize specialises from other UNESCO Literacy Prizes that "it gives special consideration to the development and use of mother-tongue literacy education and training."

Each award consists of a sum of US $20,000, a silver medal and a certificate.

Recent laureates

2017
Center for the Study of Learning (CSLP) at Concordia University (Canada) CSLP at Concordia University is awarded for Using Educational Technology to Develop Essential Educational Competencies in Sub-Saharan Africa project, which develops and distributes its material internationally free of charge 
 We Love Reading (Jordan) is honoured as a programme with a virtual community that offers online read-aloud trainings for parents,  mobilizes volunteers to read aloud in community spaces to children and provides age-appropriate material through a digital library.

2016
 Patani Malay-Thai Bi/Multilingual Education Project (PMT-MLE), Research Institute for Languages and Cultures of Asia, Mahidol University  - Thailand
 Books for rural areas of Viet Nam, Center for Knowledge Assistance and Community Development  - Viet Nam

2013
 Mother Tongue Literacy in the Guera Region programme, Federation of Associations for the Promotion of Guera Languages - Chad 
 Saakshar Bharat (Literate India) Mission, National Literacy Mission Authority, Ministry of Human Resource Development - India

2012
 Directorate of Community Education Development - Indonesia 
 National Adult Literacy Programme, Pentecostal Church - Rwanda
 Honourable Mention: Directorate of Literacy and Adult Education - Niger

2011
 National Literacy Service - Burundi 
 National Institute for the Education of Adults - Mexico
 Honourable Mention: City Literacy Coordinating Council, Tagum City - Philippines

2010
 Virtual Assisted Literacy Programme, The North Catholic University Foundation, Antioquia - Colombia
 General Directorate of Adult Training - Cape Verde
 Family Literacy Project (FLY) - Hambourg

2009
 Nirantar - India
 Tin Tua - Burkina Faso

2008
 People's Action Forum, Reflect and HIV/AIDS - Zambia
 Honourable Mention: BBC-RAW (Reading and Writing) - UK

2007
 TOSTAN - Senegal
 The Children's Book Project -  Tanzania

2006
 Youth and Adult Literacy and Education Chair of the Latin American and Caribbean Pedagogical Institute of the Republic of Cuba (IPLAC) - Cuba
 Mother Child Education Foundation - Turkey

2005
 AULA Cultural Association -  Spain
 GOAL Sudan - Sudan

2004
 Alfabetização Solidária (AlfaSol)] - Brazil
 The Steering Group of Literacy Education in Qinghai Province - China

2003
 Tembaletu Community Education Centre - South Africa
 International Reflect Circle (CIRAC)

2002
 Regional Centre for Adult Education (ASFEC) - Egypt
 Bunyad Literacy Community Council (BLCC) - Pakistan

2001
 Tianshui Education Commission, Gansu Province - China
 Alfatitbonit/Alfa Desalin Project - Haiti

2000
 Juvenile Education - Iraq
 National Literacy and Basic Education Directorate - Senegal

See also 
List of international literacy prizes
International Literacy Day
United Nations Literacy Decade
UNESCO Nadezhda K. Krupskaya literacy prize
UNESCO Confucius Prize for Literacy
Noma Literacy Prize

External links 
 UNESCO King Sejong Literacy Prize
 UNESCO International Literacy Prizes

References

UNESCO awards
Education awards
Literacy-related awards
Awards established in 1989
Sejong the Great